The How Big Tour, How Blue Tour and the How Beautiful Tour were a series of three concert tours by British indie band Florence and the Machine, in support of their third studio album, How Big, How Blue, How Beautiful. The tour began on 9 September 2015 in Belfast, Northern Ireland and concluded on 3 July 2016 in Werchter, Belgium at Rock Werchter.

Set list

{{hidden
| headercss = background: #ccccff; font-size: 100%; width: 65%;
| contentcss = text-align: left; font-size: 100%; width: 75%;
| header = 2015 Abu Dhabi Grand Prix
|content =
"What the Water Gave Me"
"Ship to Wreck"
"Rabbit Heart (Raise It Up)"
"Third Eye"
"Delilah"
"You've Got the Love" 
"How Big, How Blue, How Beautiful"
"Shake It Out"
"Sweet Nothing" 
"Queen of Peace" 
"What Kind of Man"
"Spectrum (Say My Name)" 
"Dog Days Are Over"
Encore
  "Mother"
"Drumming Song" 
}}

Shows

Box office score data

Notes

References

Florence and the Machine concert tours
2015 concert tours
2016 concert tours